The following is a list of Miss Universe pageant edition and information.

Host country/territory by number
Currently 38 editions are held at the United States continental territory, and 33 hosts outside of the United States.

References

External links
 

Editions
Lists of beauty pageants editions